Transgene S.A. is a French biotechnology company founded in 1979. It is based in Illkirch-Graffenstaden, near Strasbourg, and develops and manufactures immunotherapies for the treatment of cancer.

The company has two technological platforms based on these respective approaches: myvac (therapeutic vaccines) and Invir.IO (oncolytic viruses). Transgene’s portfolio consists of four products currently in clinical development.

Since January 2021, Hedi Ben Brahim has served as President and Chief Executive Officer of Transgene SA. The company is listed on the Paris Stock Exchange.

History 
Transgene was founded in 1979, on the initiative of Pierre Chambon and Philippe Kourilsky. Jean-Pierre Lecocq was the first Scientific Director of Transgene in 1980.

Technological platforms

Transgene owns two technological platforms:

  Invir.IO is a technology platform based on the patented oncolytic viruses that replicate only in cancer cells. The genome of these viruses has been modified to express anti-tumor therapies directly within the tumor.
 Myvac is a platform for individualized therapeutic vaccines based on MVA viruses.  The platform enables the design of personalized viruses based on each patient’s tumor mutations. Transgene selects around 30 neoantigens per patient, based on the AI of its partner NEC, and then encodes them into viral DNA.

Products in development

The Company has 4 clinical-stage products in its portfolio. These candidates are distinguished according to two product categories: therapeutic vaccines and oncolytic viruses.

• Therapeutic vaccines:

- “TG4001” is a therapeutic vaccine designed to express the E6 and E7 antigens of the HPV-16 virus (human papillomavirus type 16). It is currently in a Phase Ib/II clinical trial evaluating TG4001 in combination with avelumab (in collaboration with Merck KGaA and Pfizer) in patients with advanced or metastatic HPV-16 positive cancers.

- “TG4050” is an individualized immunotherapy from the myvac® platform. This candidate is currently evaluated in two Phase I clinical trials in ovarian cancer and Head and Neck cancer. The trials are enrolling patients in the US, in France, and in the UK.

• Oncolytic viruses

- “TG6002” is an oncolytic virus designed to express a recombinant enzyme within tumor cells capable of converting 5-FC (5-fluorocytosine) into 5-FU (5-fluorouracil), a chemotherapy agent. The expression of this enzyme is enabled by the addition of the FCU1 gene into the viral DNA of TG6002.

- “BT-001” is an oncolytic virus derived from Invir.IO™ platform. It has been modified to encode the anti-CTLA4 antibody and the cytokine GM-CSF to target the tumor microenvironment. BT-001 is currently being evaluated in a Phase I/II clinical trial in solid tumors.  Transgene is collaborating with BioInvent for the development of this product.

- Transgene and AstraZeneca have been collaborating since 2019 to co-develop oncolytic viruses from the Invir.IO™ platform.

Management Committee

Transgene’s Management Committee is composed of the following members:

  Hedi Ben Brahim, Chairman & Chief Executive Officer (CEO);
  Éric Quéméneur, Executive Vice-President, Chief Scientific Officer (CSO);
  Christophe Ancel, Vice-President Pharmaceutical Operations & Qualified Pharmacist;
  Maud Brandely-Talbot, Vice-President Medical Affairs, Chief Medical Officer (CMO);
  Jean-Philippe Del, Vice-President, Chief Financial Officer (CFO);
  Thibaut du Fayet, Vice-President Corporate Development;
  John Felitti, Vice-President, General Counsel, Corporate Secretary;
  Gaëlle Stadtler, Vice-President, Human Resources Director.

References

External links
 

Biotechnology companies established in 1979
Biotechnology companies of France
Companies listed on Euronext Paris
Life sciences industry
Pharmaceutical companies established in 1979
Pharmaceutical companies of France